is a Buddhist temple in southern Kyoto, Japan, known today primarily for the quality of its garden.

History
Sanbō-in was established in the Azuchi-Momoyama period (1582–1615).  It was a sub-temple of Daigo-ji, which is a Heian period temple founded in 902.  The temple complex had fallen into disrepair during the Sengoku period.

A majority of the present buildings and the garden of Sanbō-in date from the late 16th century. The garden is designed as a stroll garden with a large pond and several paths and bridges.  The garden is said to contain over 700 stones; and one of them, called the Fujito stone, is said to have cost over 5,000 bushels of rice. Sanbō-in is also a noteworthy illustration of a landscape garden which is designed for viewing from a specific perspective within a building.  As laid out in the Momoyama period, the garden remains one of the finest uses of the "fortuitous crane," the "tortoise" and the "isle of eternal youth."  These poetic terms identify specific ways in which stones and ponds are poised in a prescribed, esoteric relationship.

In 1598, Toyotomi Hideyoshi helped redesign the garden before his famous cherry blossom-viewing party. The karamon was either transferred from Fushimi castle or built there at the same time, and the main drawing room (表書院 omote shoin), another National Treasure, was finished shortly before Hideyoshi's death in September of that year. Hideyoshi's envisioned garden was completed in 1618, and Yoshiro, the chief gardener, received the title of "Kentei" (Excellent Gardener) for his work.

See also
List of Special Places of Scenic Beauty, Special Historic Sites and Special Natural Monuments
 List of Buddhist temples in Kyoto
 List of National Treasures of Japan (residences)
For an explanation of terms concerning Japanese Buddhism, Japanese Buddhist art, and Japanese Buddhist temple architecture, see the Glossary of Japanese Buddhism.

Notes

References

 Kirby, John B. 1962.  From Castle to Teahouse: Japanese Architecture of the Momoyama Period. Tokyo: Tuttle Publishing.   OCLC 512972
 Ponsonby-Fane, Richard Arthur Brabazon. (1956).  Kyoto: The Old Capital of Japan, 794-1869. Kyoto: The Ponsonby Memorial Society.  OCLC 36644

External links
 University of Pennsylvania, Fine Arts Library Image Collection:  Samboin garden
 Bowdoin College: Classical elements of gardens;  bridges; islands. 
  aerial view and map image

Religious organizations established in the 16th century
Buddhist temples in Kyoto
Special Places of Scenic Beauty
Special Historic Sites
Important Cultural Properties of Japan
Monzeki